The men's team was an artistic gymnastics event held as part of the Gymnastics at the 1904 Summer Olympics programme.  It was the first time a team event, in the sense of combining scores of individual gymnasts, was held at the Olympics.  Previous team events had been performances by large groups of gymnasts at a single time. The competition was held on Friday, July 1, 1904 and on Saturday, July 2, 1904.

Seventy eight gymnasts competed in 13 teams. The scores of the top 6 members of each team counted toward the team total.

Results

The following clubs did not compete as a team, as they did not enter with at least six gymnasts.

References

Sources
 
 

Team